Fliegerstaffel 17 (No. 17 Squadron) "Falcons" of the Swiss Air Force is a Berufsfliegerkorps squadron of professional pilots flying McDonnell Douglas F/A-18. Together with Fliegerstaffel 6 it forms Fliegergeschwader 11. The home base of the squadron is Payerne Air Base. Fliegerstaffel 17 features a red falcon on a white ground with the black number 17 as its coat of arms.

History 

From 1925 to 1939 the unit, which was founded as interception aviation company 17 (Jagd-Flieger-Kompanie 17), was equipped with eight Häfeli DH-5s and a Dewoitine D-27. From 1939 to 1942, flights were operated with C-35 and Fokker CV from Belinzona, Littau, Rümlang, Weinfelden, Hilfikon, Spreitenbach and other then airfields.
In 1942 they were trained to fly the C-3603 at their new home, Buochs Air Base. From 1945 to 1947 its flight operations with C-3603 were carried out from Raron.
In the post-war period, the interception company 17 was transferred into No. 3 squadron of the UeG (Überwachungsgeschwader) and used various aircraft types, among them the Morane D‐3800 from 1947 to 1955 and the C-3604 from 1947 to 1956.

In 1952, today's Fliegerstaffel 17 was founded as a unit of pilots only. The first jet aircraft operations of the Fliegerstaffel 17 were taken up from 1955 with De Havilland D.H. 112 Mk 4 Venom on Buochs Air Base and Militärflugplatz Emmen, which continued until 1967. In 1963, the "Falcon" was introduced as a new squadron emblem. From 1969 to 1975, flight operations were conducted with Mirage IIIS from Turtmann Air Base, followed by a period at Payerne Air Base from 1976 to 1997. After that it became the first squadron of the Swiss Air Force flying the F/A-18 Hornet. At the end of 2005, the Überwachunggeschwader was disbanded and its units were transferred to the similar Berufsfliegerkorps. In 2010, the F/A-18C with the tailnumber J-5017 received a permanent squadron painting. In normal flight operation the J-5017 is given priority to the pilots of Fliegerstaffel 17, but is also flown by other pilots. If the current F/A-18 Hornet Solo Display pilot is from the Fliegerstaffel 17, he will fly the J-5017, if available.

The co-founder of the F/A-18 Hornet solo display and head of flight safety Stéphane Rapaz is a pilot at Fliegerstaffel 17. 

Accidents 
 On 24 March 1977, two Mirage III (J-2003 and J-2310) collided during a formation flight breakup over Payerne airfield. All parties involved survived the collision, including the commander-in-chief of the Fliegerstaffel 17 and future Chief of the Armed Forces, Christophe Keckeis.
 On 29 August 2016, the F/ A-18C  J-5022 hit the ground in the Susten Pass area shortly after take-off at Meiringen Air Base. Its pilot belonging to Fliegerstaffel 17 was killed. As an accident cause, a wrong altitude allocation of the Skyguide air traffic controller at the Tower Meiringen is assumed. The investigation is not yet completed.

Aircraft
 Häfeli DH-5
 Dewoitine D.27
 Fokker C.V
 C-35
 C3603
 C3604
 Morane D-3803
 de Havilland D.H.112 Venom
 Mirage IIIS
 F/A-18

References

External links

  Official VBS page of the Fliegerstaffel 17

  Short report on former FlSt17-pilots
  Detailed report on the 90th anniversary of the Fliegerstaffel 17 and its history, Cockpit No.12 2015
  History of Squadron 17 

Squadrons of the Swiss Air Force
Military units and formations established in 1925